Ryabets or Riabets is a Ukrainian surname. Notable people with the surname include:

 Bohdan Riabets (born 1991), Ukrainian footballer
 Nadezhda Ryabets (born 2000), Kazakhstani boxer

Ukrainian-language surnames